Troubled Waters is a 1936 British mystery film directed by Albert Parker and starring James Mason, Virginia Cherrill, Alastair Sim, Raymond Lovell and Sam Wilkinson. It was made at Wembley Studios as a quota quickie by the British subsidiary of Fox Film.

Premise
A government agent (James Mason) exposes smugglers in a British town with a dwindling spring mineral water business.

Cast
Alastair Sim as Mac MacTavish 	
Virginia Cherrill as June Elkhardt  	
James Mason as John Merriman 	
Raymond Lovell as Carter 
Bellenden Powell as Dr Garthwaite -	
	Sam Wilkinson as Lightning  
	Peter Popp as Timothy Golightly 
W.T. Ellwanger as Ezra Elkhardt

Critical reception
TV Guide gave the film two out of four stars, and wrote, "The action is sustained throughout and Mason, as usual, is very good." This was not in response to the film's actual premiere but at least twenty years later, as the first TV Guide was not published until 1953.

References

External links

1936 films
British mystery films
Films directed by Albert Parker
British black-and-white films
1936 mystery films
1930s English-language films
1930s British films
Quota quickies
Films shot at Wembley Studios
20th Century Fox films